Andrew "Andy" Crosby (born 5 November 1965 in Bella Coola, British Columbia) is a retired rower from Canada. He competed in three consecutive Summer Olympics for his native country, starting in 1988. In 1992, he was a member of the team that won the gold medal in the Men's Eights.

References
 

1965 births
Living people
Canadian male rowers
Olympic rowers of Canada
Rowers at the 1988 Summer Olympics
Rowers at the 1992 Summer Olympics
Rowers at the 1996 Summer Olympics
Sportspeople from British Columbia
Olympic gold medalists for Canada
Olympic medalists in rowing
Medalists at the 1992 Summer Olympics
20th-century Canadian people